The 2018 season is Geylang International's 23rd consecutive season in the top flight of Singapore football and in the S.League. Along with the S.League, the club will also compete in the Prime League, the Singapore Cup and the Singapore League Cup.

Key events

November 2017

On 28/11/2017, it was reported that there has been a rift between some Geylang International players and the club's management.

Squad

Sleague

Coaching staff

Transfers

Pre-season transfers

In

Out

Note 1: Ricardo Sendra was initially signed by Perseru but was released before the season start.

Retained

Note 2: Yuki Ichikawa was initially released after the season but subsequently re-signed for 2018.

Promoted

Trial

Trial (In)

Trial (Out)

Mid-season transfers

In

Out

Trial

Trial (In)

Friendlies

Pre-Season Friendly

Batam Pre-season tour

Team statistics

Appearances and goals

Competitions

Overview

Singapore Premier League

Singapore Cup

Geylang International lost 1-0 on aggregate.

References 

Geylang International FC
Geylang International FC seasons